Saint Martin's Catholic Church (also known as Loucky Church) is a Roman Catholic church building near Deweese, Nebraska. The church was built to serve a Czech immigrant congregation.

It was built in 1907–08.  It was added to the National Register in 1985.

It was designed by architect James H. Craddock and built by John E. King for a Czech immigrant congregation.

References

External links

Churches in the Roman Catholic Diocese of Lincoln
Czech-American culture in Nebraska
Churches on the National Register of Historic Places in Nebraska
Carpenter Gothic church buildings in Nebraska
Roman Catholic churches completed in 1907
Buildings and structures in Clay County, Nebraska
National Register of Historic Places in Clay County, Nebraska
1907 establishments in Nebraska
20th-century Roman Catholic church buildings in the United States